The Cape Government Railways NG 4-6-2T of 1908 was a South African narrow-gauge steam locomotive from the pre-Union era in the Cape of Good Hope.

In 1908, the Cape Government Railways placed two  Pacific type narrow-gauge steam locomotives in passenger service on the Walmer branch in Port Elizabeth. In 1912, both locomotives were assimilated into the South African Railways and renumbered.

Manufacturer
Two  narrow-gauge steam locomotives were built for the Cape Government Railways (CGR) by W.G. Bagnall in 1908. The engines were equally powerful tank locomotive versions of the CGR Type B  narrow-gauge tender locomotive of 1904, also built by Bagnall, but with Walschaerts instead of Stephenson valve gear. They were not classified and were numbered 42 and 43.

Characteristics
Like their Type B  sister engines, the locomotives had bar frames. The drivers, the middle wheelset of the coupled wheels, were flangeless to enable the engine to negotiate sharp curves.

Service

Cape Government Railways
In 1906, a passenger-only suburban branch line had been opened from Valley Junction, near Port Elizabeth on the Avontuur line, to the suburb of Walmer. It was used by up to 22 trains per day. Both locomotives were placed in service on the Walmer branch line.

South African Railways
When the Union of South Africa was established on 31 May 1910, the three Colonial government railways (CGR, Natal Government Railways and Central South African Railways) were united under a single administration to control and administer the railways, ports and harbours of the Union. Although the South African Railways and Harbours came into existence in 1910, the actual classification and renumbering of all the rolling stock of the three constituent railways were only implemented with effect from 1 January 1912.

In 1912, the two locomotives were renumbered no. NG33 and NG34 on the South African Railways (SAR), with the "NG" number prefix identifying them as narrow-gauge locomotives in the SAR registers. They remained in service on the Walmer branch for the duration of their service lives, until the line was closed in 1929. They were then withdrawn from service, shortly before a classification system for narrow-gauge locomotives was to be introduced by the SAR.

References

0440
4-6-2 locomotives
2′C1′ n2t locomotives
Bagnall locomotives
2 ft gauge locomotives
Railway locomotives introduced in 1908
1908 in South Africa
Scrapped locomotives